Geri X (born 6 May 1989) is a Bulgarian-born singer-songwriter whose music shows influences of several genres including folk, psychedelic rock, Americana, and post-rock.  She has garnered a sizable fan base and critical acclaim in the Tampa Bay music scene.

History
Born in Bulgaria, grew up in Pleven and Versailles France for sometime. Geri spent 13 years studying classical piano and hated it.  At the age of 17 moved to the United States with her family. Making Tampa/St. Petersburg Florida home. In 2001 and began her ascent to become one of Tampa Bay's beloved artist. Winning Creative Loafing's Best Singer Songwriter twice. In
2011 Geri X was named “Best of Indie” in the Bulgarian edition of Rolling Stone’s “Best of Rock”

Geri provides vocals in a duet with former Kinks lead guitarist Dave Davies, on the song "When I First Saw You" on his album It Will Be Me, which was released in June 2013 on Cleopatra Records.

Geri continues to tour and a new album is scheduled for release in 2014.

Discography

Notable studio albums

References

External links
 Official Facebook

 https://instagram.com/gerix

21st-century pianists
21st-century American women singers
21st-century American singers
Alternative rock guitarists
Alternative rock pianists
Alternative rock singers
Musicians from Pleven
Bulgarian emigrants to the United States
Women guitarists
Women rock singers
Women singer-songwriters
Writers from St. Petersburg, Florida
Singers from Florida
Songwriters from Florida
Musicians from St. Petersburg, Florida
21st-century American guitarists
Guitarists from Florida
21st-century American women guitarists
21st-century women pianists
1989 births
Living people